Rifat Chadirji ( Rifa'a al-Khādarjī, also Romanized Rifa'at Al Chaderchi; 6 December 1926 – 10 April 2020) was an Iraqi Turkmen architect. He was often referred to as the father of modern Iraqi architecture, having designed more than 100 buildings across the nation.

Early life 
Chadirji was born in Baghdad in 1926 into an influential family. His father, Kamil Chadirji, played a central role in Iraq's political life as the founder in 1946 and then president of the National Democratic Party.

Chadirji trained as an architect. In 1952, after completing his graduate training, he returned to Baghdad and began working on what he called his "architectural experiments." Rifat Chadirji's architecture is inspired by the characteristics of regional Iraqi architecture, and the time-tested intelligence inherent in it, but at the same time, he wanted to reconcile tradition with contemporary social needs. In an interview, Chadirji explained his philosophy:

In the context of architecture, Chadirji called this approach international regionalism. Chadirji's approach was entirely consistent with the objectives of the Modern Baghdad Group, founded in 1951, of which he was an early member. This art group sought to combine ancient Iraqi heritage with modern art and architecture, to develop an Iraqi aesthetic, that was not only unique to Iraq, but also influence the development of a pan-Arab visual language.

Career 
Chadirji's early works were firmly grounded in the discourse being conducted by members of the Baghdad Modern Art Group, including sculptors Jawad Saleem and Mohammed Ghani Hikmat, and artist-intellectual, Shakir Hassan Al Said. His designs relied on abstracting the concepts and elements of traditional buildings, and reconstructing them in contemporary forms. However, Chadirji's critics have pointed out that although Chadirji was sympathetic to the group's aims, he was essentially a modernist at heart.

Chadirji's early works were primarily reconstructions of old buildings and residential homes. The first house design of Chadirji's was for Baher Faik, a former statesman and ambassador of Iraq during the 50s. In 1959, he was commissioned to construct a major public monument, The Monument to the Unknown Soldier, which was later destroyed by Saddam Hussein's Ba'athist government, and replaced with a statue of Hussein himself. Chadirji's monument, centrally located in Baghdad's Ferdous Square, referenced Iraq's tradition, the monument evoked the parabolic arch from the Sassanid Palace, Ctesiphon. Described as a simple, symbolic, modernist structure, sketches of the design concept found at the Institute of Fine Arts in Baghdad, reveal the inspiration for the design which represents a mother bending over to pick up her martyred child.

Chadirji would continue to use ancient Iraqi motifs in his building designs. His works, such as the Hussain Jamil Residence (1953), Tobacco Warehouse (1965), the Rafiq Residence (1965) and the Central Post Office (1975), are informed by Iraqi practices of temperature control – natural ventilation, courtyards, screen walls and reflected light. He also employed the architectural language of arches and monolithic piers that remind visitors of ancient Iraqi architectural history. Although, his designs often used vernacular elements, he often abstracted them and incorporated them in new forms. At times, he relied on traditional exteriors, but designed European interiors.

In 1978, Chadirji was jailed for life for unfounded charges during the Ahmed Hassan al-Bakr presidency. However, after serving almost two years in the Abu Ghraib prison, he was released when Saddam Hussein assumed power. Saddam wanted Iraq's best architect to oversee the preparations for an international conference to be held in Baghdad in 1983 and to assist with general plans to give Baghdad a facelift. He became Hussein's architectural consultant for Baghdad City Planning, for the period, 1982–1983. While imprisoned, he wrote a book on architecture, Al Ukhaidir and the Crystal Palace, using materials that his wife had smuggled into Abu Ghraib. The book has been described as a "seminal work" on the subject of Iraq's architecture.

In the 1980s, Chadirji became Councillor to the Mayor, a role that found him overseeing all the reconstruction projects in Baghdad. He left Iraq in 1983 to take up an academic position at Harvard University. Some years later, on his return to Baghdad, he was saddened by the deterioration in the city. He and his wife decided to leave Iraq permanently and they settled in London, where he continued to live.

Along with his father, Chadirji photographically documented much of Baghdad and the larger region of Iraq and Syria. They feared the regional architecture and monuments would be lost to new development associated with the oil boom. In 1995, he published a book of his father's precious photographs. His father's position as a politician gave him access to many people and places that may have been difficult for other photographers.

In an interview with Ricardo Karam, Chadirji talked about his atheism; after studying philosophy with his wife Balqees Sharara, he came to the understanding that religions originated from magic. He also said that he respected all religions, and asked after his death that prayers not be offered for him, and that his body be cremated.

Work 
Although Chadirji designed many residences, he is most noted for his public works, including both buildings and monuments. His Monument to the Unknown Soldier (1959), described as a simple, symbolic, modernist structure, was removed from al-Fardous Square to make way for a statue of Sadam Hussein in the early 1980s. The replacement statue was infamously toppled on 9 April 2003 in full view of the world, as global media filmed and photographed the destruction.

Associated publications 
Chadirji's publications are primarily in Arabic and include:
al-Ukhaidir and the Crystal Palace (1991)
A Dialogue on the Structure of Art and Architecture (1995).
Regenerative approaches to mosque design-competition to State Mosque, Baghdad. In Mimar 1984,11 page 44-63 .
Concepts & Influences: Towards a Regionalized International Architecture, 1987.ISBN no. 0-7103-0180-4.
Internationalised Tradition in Architecture, 1988. ISBN no. 1-85035-146-5.

Awards 
 1964: Bronze Medal, Barcelona Furniture Design
 1986: Chairman's Award of the Aga Khan Award for Architecture
 2008: Sheikh Zayed' Book Award, 2008
 2015: Honorary PhD from Coventry University
 2015: Lifetime Achievement Award from Tamayouz Excellence Award

Legacy 

In 2017, the Rifat Chadirji Prize was created to recognise local architects who are involved in rebuilding parts of Iraq that had been destroyed. The prize is awarded under the umbrella of the Tamayouz Award for Excellence.

In the same year, he also donated his architectural archive and the photographic archives of his father, Kamil Chadirji, to the Aga Khan Documentation Center, MIT Libraries.

Personal life 
In 1954, he married Balkis Shahara  He retired from practice in 1982 and thereafter devoted his time to research and writing.

Chadirji died from COVID-19 in London on 10 April 2020, at the age of 93. The Iraqi prime minister designate Mustafa Al-Kadhimi and the Iraqi president Barham Salih both paid their tributes.

See also 
Culture of Iraq
Iraqi art
Islamic art
Islamic architecture
List of Iraqi artists
Tomb of the Unknown Soldier

References 

1926 births
2020 deaths
Artists from Baghdad
Iraqi architects
Iraqi atheists
Iraqi designers
Writers from Baghdad
Deaths from the COVID-19 pandemic in England
Iraqi emigrants to the United Kingdom
Iraqi Turkmen people